Svimon or Simon Mukhranbatoni (17 August 1726 – 13 February 1785) was a Georgian nobleman of the House of Mukhrani, a collateral branch of the royal Bagrationi dynasty of Kartli. He was Prince (batoni) of Mukhrani and ex officio commander of the Banner of Shida Kartli and Grand Master of the Household (msakhurt-ukhutsesi) at the court of Kartli from 1756 to 1778.

Career  
Svimon was a son of Levan, Prince of Mukhrani, and a certain Princess Elene. He acceded to the titles and possessions of his father in 1756, in the reign of King Teimuraz II of Kartli, succeeding on the death of his relative, Constantine III, Prince of Mukhrani, whose heirs were in their minority. He was further appointed by Teimuraz as nasakhchibashi, "Lord High Executioner", the office which gave rise to his moniker, Svimon the nasakhchibashi (სვიმონ ნასახჩიბაში). 

During the 1768–74 war between the Russian and Ottoman empires, in which the Georgians allied themselves with the Russians, Prince Svimon contributed to the victory of Teimuraz II's son and successor, King Heraclius II of Georgia at Aspindza in April 1770. During the campaign, Heraclius was abandoned by his ally, the Russian general Count Totleben, and the Georgian forces had to confront a larger Turkish-Lesgian army. The night before the battle Prince Svimon led some two dozen men and clandestinely dismantled the only bridge across the river, stranding the enemy forces on the riverbank and allowing Heraclius to win a decisive victory. In 1778, a change in political climate forced Prince Svimon to abdicate in favor of his nephew, Ioane, and retire to Russia.

Family 
Prince Svimon was married twice, first to a certain Tamar and secondly to Ana (1733–1823), probably a daughter of Prince Alexander of Kartli. He had the following children:
 Prince Katsia (c. 1764 – 1826), who had two sons. His male-line progeny still survive in modern-day Georgia.
 Prince Giorgi (1765–1825), who was married Princess Ekaterine Abashidze (died 1822) and had a daughter, Sophio (1809–1847), killed by peasants in a notorious incident along with her husband, Prince Alexander Sumbatashvili (Sumbatov), and two children. Ivan Sumbatov, a surviving child of the murdered couple, was the father of a Georgian–Russian actor, Alexander Yuzhin.     
 Prince Ermile (Ermia; 1780–1862), who was married to Princess Ketevan Vachnadze, with six children.
 Prince Davit (died 1828), who was married, with three children.
 Princess Salome (died 1820), who was married to Prince Davit Abashishvili, a Georgian courtier, with three children.

References 

1726 births
1785 deaths
House of Mukhrani
18th-century people from Georgia (country)